WillGriff John (born 4 December 1992) is an English born Welsh qualified rugby union player that currently plays for Scarlets in the United Rugby Championship. His playing position is tighthead prop.

Club career
Born in Plymouth and raised in the South Wales Valleys, John began his playing career at Pontypridd as well as representing Wales at all Junior Levels. He also played for Cardiff Blues and was part of the squad that won the European Challenge Cup in 2010. In 2013 he moved to New Zealand and played for two seasons in the ITM Cup with the province of Northland.

John then returned to the UK and joined Doncaster in the Championship in 2014. On 3 May 2017 John was signed by Sale Sharks. Becoming a first-team regular for Sale, in the English Premiership. His naturally strong build makes him ideal for Prop duties, such as clearing out, or rolling forward scrums and mauls.

John will leave Sale to join Scarlets for the 2021–22 season.

International career
On 15 January 2020, John was named in the Wales squad for the 2020 Six Nations Championship. He was named in the starting side against Scotland, but the match was cancelled prior to kickoff due to COVID-19.

On 6 November 2021, John made his Wales debut coming off the bench against South Africa. John made his first start against Fiji later in the month.

References

External links
Sale Sharks' Player Profile

1992 births
Living people
Cardiff Rugby players
Doncaster Knights players
English people of Welsh descent
English rugby union players
Pontypridd RFC players
Rugby union players from Plymouth, Devon
Rugby union props
Sale Sharks players
Wales international rugby union players
Northland rugby union players
Scarlets players
Welsh rugby union players